John Emory Bryant (October 13, 1836 – February 27, 1900) served in the Union Army during the American Civil War and the Freedmens Bureau in Georgia during the Reconstruction Era. He also worked as a newspaper editor, Republican Party organizer, member of the Georgia House of Representatives and a candidate for U.S. Congress. Duke University has a collection of papers related to Bryant. He corresponded with William Anderson Pledger and Henry McNeal Turner. He was a member of the Methodist Church and involved in the temperance movement.

He served in the 8th Maine Volunteers during the Civil War.

Bryant was born in Wayne, Maine to Benjamin Franklin Bryant, a Methodist minister and Lucy Ford French. He graduated in 1859 from Maine Wesleyan Seminary.

Bryant married Emma Frances Spaulding and they had one child, Emma Alice Bryant (1871–1946).

Further reading
Carpetbagger of Conscience: A Biography of John Emory Bryant by Ruth Currie

References

Union Army soldiers
Freedmen's Bureau
People of the Reconstruction Era
Republican Party members of the Georgia House of Representatives
People from Wayne, Maine
1836 births
1900 deaths
Methodists from Maine
19th-century American politicians
Methodists from Georgia (U.S. state)